Zwischengeschlecht (literally "between sexes") is a human rights advocacy group campaigning on intersex bodily autonomy issues. The group demonstrates outside medical events where surgical interventions are discussed or performed, engages with the media, and participates in consultations with human rights institutions.

Advocacy

Physical integrity and bodily autonomy
Zwischengeschlecht were consulted by the Swiss National Advisory Commission on Biomedical Ethics in the preparation of an Opinion report, On the management of differences of sex development, Ethical issues relating to "intersexuality" in November 2012. The report is notable for making a clear apology for damage done to intersex people in the past, and up until the present. It recommends deferring all "non-trivial" surgeries which have "irreversible consequences". The report also recommended criminal sanction for non-medically necessary genital surgeries.

The organization actively campaigns for recognition of intersex medical interventions as forms of "intersex genital mutilation", including through submissions to UN institutions. In March 2017, Zwischengeschlecht reported that the UN had made 22 concluding observations on the performance of UN member states according to their international treaty obligations. This included 14 countries, across in Europe, Latin America, Asia, Africa and Oceania.

Protection from discrimination
In 2016, Zwischengeschlecht described actions to promote equality or civil status legislation without action on banning "intersex genital mutilations" as a form of pinkwashing. The organization has previously highlighted evasive government statements to UN Treaty Bodies that conflate intersex, transgender and LGBT issues, instead of addressing harmful practices on infants.

Identification documents
Zwischengeschlecht have described media coverage of moves to create a third gender classification as "silly season fantasies"; the main goal is to stop intersex genital mutilations.

Visibility work 
The group demonstrates outside medical events where surgical interventions are discussed or performed, and engages with the media.

International activities
Zwischengeschlecht participated in the third International Intersex Forum in late 2013, and also contributed to a joint statement to the United Nations Human Rights Council on 11 March 2014.

See also
 Intersex human rights
 Intersex rights in Switzerland
 Intersex rights in Germany
 Intersex rights by country

References

External links 
  Zwischengeschlecht
  Zwischengeschlecht

Intersex medical and health organizations
Intersex rights organizations
Human rights organisations based in Switzerland
Medical and health organisations based in Switzerland
Intersex rights in Switzerland